Walburga Wegner (25 August 1908 in Cologne – 23 February 1993 idem at age 74) was a German operatic soprano who appeared at major opera houses internationally and made recordings.

Further reading 
 Jörg Sorgenicht: Walburga Wegner. Die Karriere einer Sängerin im Spiegel der internationalen Presse. Düsseldorf - Beuthen - Köln - Göttingen - Mailand - Paris - Glyndebourne - Edinburgh - New York - Wien - London - Lissabon - Eutin. J. Sorgenicht, Essen 1997; 
 Klaus Ulrich Spiegel: Faszination in Vielfalt - Walburga Wegner, ein deutscher Soprano drammatico. (HAfG)

References

External links 
 
 Walburga Wegner - Oper & Lied bei Hamburger Archiv für Gesangskunst
 

1908 births
1993 deaths
Musicians from Cologne
German operatic sopranos
20th-century German  women opera singers